In 2008, Sheffield ranked among the top 10 UK cities as a business location and aims to regenerate itself as a modern technology and sports based city. Sheffield has an international reputation for metallurgy and steel-making.  It was this industry that established it as one of England's main industrial cities during the 18th, 19th and 20th centuries. This industry used Sheffield's unique combination of local Iron, Coal and water power supplied by the local rivers.  This fuelled a massive growth in the city's population that expanded from 60,995 in 1801 to a peak of 577,050 in 1951.  However, due to increasing competition from imports, it has seen a decline in heavy engineering industries since the 1960s, which has forced the sector to streamline its operations and lay off the majority of the local employment.  The steel industry now concentrates on more specialist steel-making and, in 2005, produced more steel per year by value than at any other time in its history. The industry is now less noticeable as it has become highly automated and employs far fewer staff than in the past.  However a small number of skilled industrial automation engineers still thrive in it.  Today the economy is worth over £7 billion a year.

The largest employers are now all public sector:  the two universities, NHS, and national and local government employees.  Private fee-paying international students are also a major source (£120 million per year) of income to the local economy through the universities.

History
The steel industry dates back to at least the 14th century. In 1740 Benjamin Huntsman discovered the crucible technique for steel manufacture, at his workshop in the district of Handsworth. This process had an enormous impact on the quantity and quality of steel production and was only made obsolete, a century later, in 1856 by Henry Bessemer's invention of the Bessemer converter which allowed the true mass production of steel.  Bessemer had moved his Bessemer Steel Company to Sheffield to be at the heart of the industry. Thomas Boulsover invented Sheffield Plate (silver-plated copper), in the early 18th century.  A major Sheffield steel invention was that of stainless steel by Harry Brearley in 1912, and the work of Profs. F. B. Pickering and T. Gladman throughout the 1960s, '70s, and '80s was fundamental to the development of modern high strength low alloy steels.

The Sheffield Assay Office, which opened in 1773, stamps precious metals with the city's crown mark. The Company of Cutlers in Hallamshire was created in 1624 to regulate the manufacture of edged tools. The head of this company (the Master Cutler) is held in regard equal to the city's lord mayor and it has powers over the trademarking of steel with the Sheffield area.

While iron and steel have always been the main industries of Sheffield, coal mining has been a major feature of the outlying areas, and the Palace of Westminster in London was built using limestone and paving from quarries in the nearby villages of Anston and Green Moor.

The Sheffield Industrial Museums Trust, a partnership between Sheffield City Council, Sheffield Hallam University and the Company of Cutlers in Hallamshire has preserved key sites associated with the city's industrial heritage, some of which actually still operate ancient equipment for the public, such as the Abbeydale Industrial Hamlet and the Kelham Island Museum.  Northwest of the city lies Wortley Top Forge, which was a heavy ironworks of international renown.  It is a site of historical and industrial importance, contributing to Sheffield's reputation for manufacturing high-quality, precision steel goods, though actually it is located within the boundaries of neighbouring Barnsley.

Economy

This is a chart of trend of regional gross value added (GVA) of Sheffield at current basic prices published (pp. 240–253) by Office for National Statistics with figures in millions of British Pounds Sterling.

 includes hunting and forestry

 includes energy and construction

 includes financial intermediation services indirectly measured

 Components may not sum to totals due to rounding

The city spearheaded the knowledge advances which gave it preeminence in steel and cutlery production; today the transfer of technology from Sheffield's universities is claimed by some to be "guaranteeing" Sheffield's continuing industrial and commercial evolution, creating cutting-edge enterprises across the city. High technology businesses such as the US company Fluent, Inc., for example, have chosen Sheffield as the centre for their international operations and so has Jennic, specialists in semiconductor design for the home automation, commercial building automation, and industrial process monitoring and control markets. The University of Sheffield supports the growth of technology transfer in the Sheffield City Region through the Kroto Innovation Centre and Sheffield Bioincubator which house small and medium enterprises as well as startup companys working in similar areas, or occasionally alongside, University of Sheffield researchers. 

Insight Enterprises will invest £50 million in a new European headquarters in the city resulting in 1700 jobs over the 2005-2008 period, while Boeing, through its collaboration with the University of Sheffield will be at the centre of an Advanced Manufacturing Park (AMP) on the edge of the city, home to a cluster of businesses in the advanced manufacturing sector. Other areas of employment include call centres, the City Council, universities and hospitals.

There are signs that the Sheffield economy is seeing a revival. The 2004 Barclays Bank Financial Planning study revealed that, in 2003, the Sheffield district of Hallam was the highest ranking area outside London for overall wealth, the proportion of people earning over £60,000 a year standing at almost 12%. A survey by Knight Frank revealed that Sheffield was the fastest growing city outside London for office and residential space and rents during the second half of 2004.

Cushman & Wakefield's respected Global Research Reports include the "UK Cities Monitor 2008" which placed Sheffield among the top ten "best cities to locate a business today", and reported 3rd and 4th places respectively for best office location and best new call centre location. The same report places Sheffield in 3rd place regarding "greenest reputation" and 2nd in terms of the availability of financial incentives.

As an example of the city's move away from traditional industry, Sheffield is now the home to one of the country's fastest growing online job boards, My Job Group, whose HQ is based there and serves the city with its very own jobs board. This site competes strongly with the traditional way of finding employment in Sheffield which is through the local newspaper whose main vacancies day is Thursday. Technology is also one of the fastest growing industries in Sheffield being home to Capita, Plusnet and Littlefish.

Organised by the Sheffield Chamber of Commerce and Industry, the Sheffield Business Awards is an awards ceremony held on an annual basis to help highlight and promote business and industry in Sheffield and boost the economy of the city.

In 2012, Sheffield City Region Enterprise Zone was launched to promote development in a number of sites in Sheffield and across the wider region. In March 2014 additional sites were added to the zone.

See also
 ShakeClub

References

External links
Sheffield City Council
Creative Sheffield